The Icebreaker is a 2016 Russian disaster film directed by Nikolay Khomeriki. The plot of the film is based in part on the real events that occurred in 1985 with the icebreaker , which was trapped by Antarctic ice and spent 133 days in forced drift. 
The film premiered in Russia on October 20, 2016.

Plot
In the Spring of 1985. The icebreaker "Mikhail Somov" is off the coast of Antarctica. While navigating, the ship heads towards an iceberg and Captain Petrov starts to take measures to avoid it. The captain's efforts are hindered when a passenger and dog fall overboard. Because of the rescue operation, the ship fails to avoid the iceberg and sustains damage.

The First Officer, who has shown antipathy towards the Captain due to his perception that the Captain runs a lax ship radios the undefined “Ministry” in Leningrad, to which the Ministry issues orders removing the captain.

A new captain Valentin Sevchenko, a man of uncompromising and domineering power, is sent to the ship by helicopter. He immediately enters into a confrontation with Andrei Petrov, accusing the latter of disorder and as a consequence of the misfortune that has occurred. Under the control of Sevchenko, the icebreaker rises in the ice. His actions to the extreme heat up the already heavy atmosphere on the ship: the sailors are starting to give up nerves, which provokes conflict within the team. In anticipation of rescue, the crew of the ship spends 133 days among the ice.

Cast

Production

Filming took place in severe weather conditions in Murmansk, Saint Petersburg, Sevastopol and in the mountains of the Kola Peninsula - Khibiny for 3.5 months. The 1957 nuclear icebreaker Lenin was used, which has now been taken out of service 1989 and parked permanently in Murmansk.

Box office
During the opening weekend, the film led the Russian rental market, bypassing the American action movie Jack Reacher: Never Go Back with Tom Cruise in the title role and collecting 127.3 million rubles (129). However, even so, the film at the box office collected less than 3/5 of the amount spent on it.

References

External links 

2016 films
2010s Russian-language films
2010s disaster films
2016 action drama films
Films directed by Nikolay Khomeriki
Russian disaster films
Russian action drama films
Russian adventure thriller films
Films set in Antarctica
Disaster films based on actual events
Films scored by Tuomas Kantelinen